Acraga ria is a moth of the family Dalceridae. It is found in southern Brazil and Peru. Records from Panama represent a misidentification. The habitat consists of subtropical moist forests.

The length of the forewings is 8–10 mm. Adults are ochreous yellow, with the hindwings, abdomen and ventral wings pale yellow. Adults are on wing from November to February.

References

Dalceridae
Moths described in 1910